Katherine or Kate Fraser (or similar) may refer to:

Catherine Fraser, Chief Justice
Katharine Fraser, Mistress of Saltoun
Katherine Fraser (cricketer), Scottish cricketer
Kate Fraser, TV announcer
Kate Fraser (physician) Early Scottish psychologist